AEK Athens F.C. history and statistics in the UEFA competitions.

Notable European Campaigns

1976–77 UEFA Cup semi-finals campaign

The club's most memorable moment in European competitions was the campaign to the semi-final of the UEFA Cup during the 1976–77 season under František Fadrhonc's management. In the way to the semi-final Athens AEK managed to eliminate four clubs. In the first round they faced Soviet champions Dynamo Moscow. In Athens, AEK won 2–0 with goals by Takis Nikoloudis and Mimis Papaioannou. In Moscow, Dynamo paid them back by winning 2–0 and leading the match to extra time. In the last minute of extra time, AEK managed to score thanks to a penalty kick by Tasos Konstantinou and proceeded to the second round. They were drawn against English 4th placed side Derby County. In Athens, a goal by Walter Wagner and an own goal by Rod Thomas gave AEK the 2–0 win. At Derby, AEK found themselves behind in the score line but responded scoring three times with Takis Nikoloudis, Tasos Konstantinou and Walter Wagner. Derby Country only managed to score a consolation goal and the match ended in a 2–3 win for AEK. In the third round AEK had to oppose Yugoslav giants Red Star Belgrade. In Athens, AEK was once again victorious by winning 2–0. Mimis Papaioannou and Thomas Mavros were the goal-scorers. In Belgrade Red Star took the lead with a goal by Petar Baralić but Walter Wagner quickly equalised. The two additional goals scored by Zoran Filipović and Dušan Savić were not enough and AEK won on away goals. In the quarter-final AEK faced their greatest challenge to that moment, English league's runners-up QPR. The first leg was played in London. The two penalty kick goals in the first ten minutes scored by Gerry Francis and another one scored by Stan Bowles gave QPR the 3–0 win and what looked like a certain qualification. Nevertheless, AEK made the impossible possible. With two goals by Thomas Mavros and ano more by Mimis Papaioannou AEK sent the match to extra time and eventually to a penalty shootout. Three minutes before the final whistle, František Fadrhonc had Nikos Christidis substitute Lakis Stergioudas, the team's regular goalkeeper. His move proved vital as Nikos Christidis saved two penalties and gave AEK a 7–6 win. In the semi-finals draw, AEK were to play either Italian league's runner-up side Juventus or Spanish league's third placed side Athletic Bilbao. Ultimately AEK had to face the Italians. In Turin, Juventus scored first with Antonello Cuccureddu but AEK responded with a goal by Lefteris Papadopoulos. Two goals by Roberto Bettega and one by Franco Causio followed, giving Juventus a 4–1 victory. Juventus also won in Nikos Goumas Stadium thanks to a goal scored by Roberto Boninsegna end went on to win their first European title.

2002–03 UEFA Champions League unbeaten campaign

Another unforgettable feat was the unbeaten run in the UEFA Champions League was the highlight of the season. The club played against Cypriot champions APOEL in the third qualifying round. In the first leg in Nicosia APOEL scored first with Marinos Ouzounidis but AEK managed to take the lead with Vasilis Borbokis scoring twice. A late equaliser by Costas Malekkos did not prove enough for APOEL as Demis Nikolaidis scored during stoppage time giving his club the win. In Athens AEK won thanks to a header by Mauricio Wright and entered the group stage where they were drawn against Belgian champions Racing Genk, Italian runner-up side Roma and UEFA Champions League's holders Real Madrid. AEK secured two goalless draws against Racing Genk in Genk and Roma in Athens before confronting Real Madrid. Defending champions Madrid drew 3–3 with AEK, but were twice behind against the Greek side. Vasilis Tsiartas became the first player to score against the Spanish side in this season's competition with a sixth-minute free-kick. However, Madrid were soon back on level terms thanks to Zinedine Zidane's goal after 15 minutes before further goals from Christos Maladenis and Demis Nikolaidis put the hosts in the driving seat. However, another Zidane strike and a second-half Guti goal ensured Madrid left with a point. An in a way opposite match was played in Madrid where Steve McManaman's two goals put Real Madrid in front during half-time and AEK equalised with goal by Kostas Katsouranis and Walter Centeno. The next match was against Racing Genk in Athens. Racing Genk scored first and AEK responded with Vasilis Lakis scoring. The group stage was concluded in Rome against Roma where AEK was once again behind in the scoreline by a goal scored by Marco Delvecchio but managed to score a late equaliser with Walter Centeno. The six draws AEK secured are a feat no other club has ever accomplished.

The team continued in the UEFA Cup and smashed Israeli champions Maccabi Haifa by achieving two of their biggest wins ever in European competitions. They first won in Athens 4–0 with goals by Grigoris Georgatos, Demis Nikolaidis, Milen Petkov and Thodoris Zagorakis and then 4–1 in Nicosia with two goals by Vasilis Lakis and two more by Kostas Katsouranis and Dimitris Nalitzis. Walid Badir had earlier scored a penalty kick for Maccabi Haifa. AEK's run was brought to an end in the last-16 round by Spanish side Málaga. They drew 0–0 in Málaga but lost 0–1 in Athens thanks to a goal by Manu.

2017–18 UEFA Europa League unbeaten campaign
On February 22, 2018, in the Round of 32, AEK was excluded as undefeated, with two draws against Dynamo Kyiv.

Overall record 

{| class="wikitable plainrowheaders" style="text-align:center"

!rowspan="2"|Competition
! colspan=8|Total
! colspan=8|Home
! colspan=8|Away
|-
!scope="col"|Pld
!scope="col"|W
!scope="col"|D
!scope="col"|L
!scope="col"|GF
!scope="col"|GA
!scope="col"|GD
!scope="col"|Win%
!scope="col"|Pld
!scope="col"|W
!scope="col"|D
!scope="col"|L
!scope="col"|GF
!scope="col"|GA
!scope="col"|GD
!scope="col"|Win%
!scope="col"|Pld
!scope="col"|W
!scope="col"|D
!scope="col"|L
!scope="col"|GF
!scope="col"|GA
!scope="col"|GD
!scope="col"|Win%
|-
!scope="row"|UEFA Champions League / European Champions Clubs' Cup

|-
!scope="row"|European Champions Clubs' Cup (up to 1991–92)

|-
!scope="row"|UEFA Champions League (since 1992–93)

|-
!scope="row"|UEFA Cup Winners' Cup / European Cup Winners' Cup

|-
!scope="row"|European Cup Winners' Cup (up to 1993–94)

|-
!scope="row"|UEFA Cup Winners' Cup (since 1994–95)

|-
!scope="row"|UEFA Europa League / UEFA Cup

|-
!scope="row"|UEFA Cup (up to 2008–09)

|-
!scope="row"|UEFA Europa League (since 2009–10)

|-
!scope="row"|UEFA Europa Conference League (since 2021–22)

|-
!scope="row"|Inter-Cities Fairs Cup (up to 1970–71)

|-
!scope="row"|Balkans Cup (up to 1980–81)

|-
!Total

 1970–71 Inter-Cities Fairs Cup matches against Twente are included.
 1960–61, 1966–67, 1967–68 and 1980–81 Balkans Cup matches are included.
 Last entry is the second match against Velež Mostar for the 2021–22 Europa Conference League second qualifying round.
 The record after the last entry is 263 matches in total (83W, 63D, 117L, GF330, GA404), with 131 home matches (60W, 33D, 38L, GF207, GA140) and 132 away matches (23W, 30D, 79L, GF123, GA264).

Match table

Key
 PR = Preliminary round
 2QR = Second qualifying round
 3QR = Third qualifying round
 PO = Play-off round
 Grp = Group stage
 R1 = First round
 R2 = Second round
 R3 = Third round
 R4 = Fourth round
 R32 = Round of 32
 QF = Quarter final
 SF = Semi final

{| class="wikitable"
! Season
! Competition
! Round
! Club
! Home
! Away
! Aggregate
! Qual.
|-
| rowspan="4"| 1960–61
| rowspan="4"| Balkans Cup
| rowspan="4"| Grp
|  Brașov
| style="text-align:center;" bgcolor=#FFDDDD| 2–4
| style="text-align:center;" bgcolor=#FFDDDD| 0–3
| style="text-align:center;" bgcolor=#FFDDDD rowspan=4| 5th
| rowspan=4 align="center"|
|-
|  Fenerbahçe
| style="text-align:center;" bgcolor=#FFFFDD| 2–2
| style="text-align:center;" bgcolor=#FFDDDD| 1–5
|-
|  Partizani
| style="text-align:center;" bgcolor=#FFDDDD| 0–3
| style="text-align:center;" bgcolor=#FFDDDD| 0–3
|-
|  Levski Sofia
| style="text-align:center;" bgcolor=#DDFFDD| 3–1
| style="text-align:center;" bgcolor=#FFDDDD| 0–3
|-
| 1963–64
| European Cup
| PR
|  Monaco
| style="text-align:center;" bgcolor=#FFFFDD| 1–1
| style="text-align:center;" bgcolor=#FFDDDD| 2–7
| style="text-align:center;" bgcolor=#FFDDDD| 3–8
|align="center"|
|-
| 1964–65
| European Cup Winners' Cup
| R1
|  Dinamo Zagreb
| style="text-align:center;" bgcolor=#DDFFDD| 2–0
| style="text-align:center;" bgcolor=#FFDDDD| 0–3
| style="text-align:center;" bgcolor=#FFDDDD| 2–3
|align="center"|
|-
| 1966–67
| European Cup Winners' Cup
| R1
|  Braga
| style="text-align:center;" bgcolor=#FFDDDD| 0–1
| style="text-align:center;" bgcolor=#FFDDDD| 2–3
| style="text-align:center;" bgcolor=#FFDDDD| 2–4
|align="center"|
|-
| rowspan="4"| 1966–67
| rowspan="4"| Balkans Cup
| rowspan="3"| Grp
|  Lokomotiv Sofia
| style="text-align:center;" bgcolor=#DDFFDD| 1–0
| style="text-align:center;" bgcolor=#FFFFDD| 3–3
| style="text-align:center;" bgcolor=#DDFFDD rowspan=3| 1st
| rowspan=3 align="center"|
|-
|  Farul Constanța
| style="text-align:center;" bgcolor=#DDFFDD| 3–0
| style="text-align:center;" bgcolor=#FFFFDD| 1–1
|-
|  Vardar
| style="text-align:center;" bgcolor=#DDFFDD| 1–0
| style="text-align:center;" bgcolor=#FFFFDD| 1–1
|-
| align="left" bgcolor= silver | F
|  Fenerbahçe
| style="text-align:center;" bgcolor=#DDFFDD| 2–1
| style="text-align:center;" bgcolor=#FFDDDD| 0–1
| style="text-align:center;" bgcolor=#FFDDDD| 2–2
|align="center"|
|-
| rowspan="3"| 1967–68
| rowspan="3"| Balkans Cup
| rowspan="3"| Grp
|  Spartak Sofia
| style="text-align:center;" bgcolor=#FFDDDD| 0–3
| style="text-align:center;" bgcolor=#FFDDDD| 1–2
| style="text-align:center;" bgcolor=#FFDDDD rowspan=3| 3rd
| rowspan=3 align="center"|
|-
|  Olimpija Ljubljana
| style="text-align:center;" bgcolor=#FFFFDD| 0–0
| style="text-align:center;" bgcolor=#FFFFDD| 3–3
|-
|  Fenerbahçe
| style="text-align:center;" bgcolor=#DDFFDD| 3–1
| style="text-align:center;" bgcolor=#FFDDDD| 0–3
|-
| rowspan="3"| 1968–69
| rowspan="3"| European Cup
| R1
|  Jeunesse Esch
| style="text-align:center;" bgcolor=#DDFFDD| 3–0
| style="text-align:center;" bgcolor=#FFDDDD| 2–3
| style="text-align:center;" bgcolor=#DDFFDD| 5–3
| align="center"|
|-
| R2
|  AB
| style="text-align:center;" bgcolor=#FFFFDD| 0–0
| style="text-align:center;" bgcolor=#DDFFDD| 2–0
| style="text-align:center;" bgcolor=#DDFFDD| 2–0
| align="center"|
|-
| QF
|  Spartak Trnava
| style="text-align:center;" bgcolor=#FFFFDD| 1–1
| style="text-align:center;" bgcolor=#FFDDDD| 1–2
| style="text-align:center;" bgcolor=#FFDDDD| 2–3
|align="center"|
|-
| 1970–71
| Inter-Cities Fairs Cup
| R1
|  FC Twente
| style="text-align:center;" bgcolor=#FFDDDD| 0–1
| style="text-align:center;" bgcolor=#FFDDDD| 0–3
| style="text-align:center;" bgcolor=#FFDDDD| 0–4
|align="center"|
|-
| 1971–72
| European Cup
| R1
|  Internazionale
| style="text-align:center;" bgcolor=#DDFFDD| 3–2
| style="text-align:center;" bgcolor=#FFDDDD| 1–4
| style="text-align:center;" bgcolor=#FFDDDD| 4–6
|align="center"|
|-
| rowspan="2"| 1972–73
| rowspan="2"| UEFA Cup
| R1
|  Salgótarján
| style="text-align:center;" bgcolor=#DDFFDD| 3–1
| style="text-align:center;" bgcolor=#FFFFDD| 1–1
| style="text-align:center;" bgcolor=#DDFFDD| 4–2
| align="center"|
|-
| R2
|  Liverpool
| style="text-align:center;" bgcolor=#FFDDDD| 1–3
| style="text-align:center;" bgcolor=#FFDDDD| 0–3
| style="text-align:center;" bgcolor=#FFDDDD| 1–6
|align="center"|
|-
| rowspan="2"| 1975–76
| rowspan="2"| UEFA Cup
| R1
|  Vojvodina
| style="text-align:center;" bgcolor=#DDFFDD| 3–1
| style="text-align:center;" bgcolor=#FFFFDD| 0–0
| style="text-align:center;" bgcolor=#DDFFDD| 3–1
| align="center"|
|-
| R2
|  Inter Bratislava
| style="text-align:center;" bgcolor=#DDFFDD| 3–1
| style="text-align:center;" bgcolor=#FFDDDD| 0–2
| style="text-align:center;" bgcolor=#FFDDDD| 3–3 (a)
|align="center"|
|-
| rowspan="5"| 1976–77
| rowspan="5"| UEFA Cup
| R1
|  Dynamo Moscow
| style="text-align:center;" bgcolor=#DDFFDD| 2–0
| style="text-align:center;" bgcolor=#FFDDDD| 1–2 
| style="text-align:center;" bgcolor=#DDFFDD| 3–2
| align="center"|
|-
| R2
|  Derby County
| style="text-align:center;" bgcolor=#DDFFDD| 2–0
| style="text-align:center;" bgcolor=#DDFFDD| 3–2
| style="text-align:center;" bgcolor=#DDFFDD| 5–2
| align="center"|
|-
| R3
|  Red Star Belgrade
| style="text-align:center;" bgcolor=#DDFFDD| 2–0
| style="text-align:center;" bgcolor=#FFDDDD| 1–3
| style="text-align:center;" bgcolor=#DDFFDD| 3–3 (a)
| align="center"|
|-
| QF
|  Queens Park Rangers
| style="text-align:center;" bgcolor=#DDFFDD| 3–0
| style="text-align:center;" bgcolor=#FFDDDD| 0–3
| style="text-align:center;" bgcolor=#DDFFDD| 3–3 (7–6p)
| align="center"|
|-
| SF
|  Juventus
| style="text-align:center;" bgcolor=#FFDDDD| 0–1
| style="text-align:center;" bgcolor=#FFDDDD| 1–4
| style="text-align:center;" bgcolor=#FFDDDD| 1–5
|align="center"|
|-
| rowspan="2"| 1977–78
| rowspan="2"| UEFA Cup
| R1
|  Târgu Mureş
| style="text-align:center;" bgcolor=#DDFFDD| 3–0
| style="text-align:center;" bgcolor=#FFDDDD| 0–1
| style="text-align:center;" bgcolor=#DDFFDD| 3–1
| align="center"|
|-
| R2
|  Standard Liège
| style="text-align:center;" bgcolor=#FFFFDD| 2–2
| style="text-align:center;" bgcolor=#FFDDDD| 1–4
| style="text-align:center;" bgcolor=#FFDDDD| 3–6
|align="center"|
|-
| rowspan="2"| 1978–79
| rowspan="2"| European Cup
| R1
|  Porto
| style="text-align:center;" bgcolor=#DDFFDD| 6–1
| style="text-align:center;" bgcolor=#FFDDDD| 1–4
| style="text-align:center;" bgcolor=#DDFFDD| 7–5
| align="center"|
|-
| R2
|  Nottingham Forest
| style="text-align:center;" bgcolor=#FFDDDD| 1–2
| style="text-align:center;" bgcolor=#FFDDDD| 1–5
| style="text-align:center;" bgcolor=#FFDDDD| 2–7
|align="center"|
|-
| 1979–80
| European Cup
| R1
|  Argeş Piteşti
| style="text-align:center;" bgcolor=#DDFFDD| 2–0
| style="text-align:center;" bgcolor=#FFDDDD| 0–3
| style="text-align:center;" bgcolor=#FFDDDD| 2–3
|align="center"|
|-
| rowspan="2"| 1980–81
| rowspan="2"| Balkans Cup
| rowspan="2"| Grp
|  Velež Mostar
| style="text-align:center;" bgcolor=#DDFFDD| 3–1
| style="text-align:center;" bgcolor=#FFDDDD| 0–2
| style="text-align:center;" bgcolor=#FFDDDD rowspan=2| 2nd
| rowspan=2 align="center"|
|-
|  Flamurtari
| style="text-align:center;" bgcolor=#DDFFDD| 3–2
| style="text-align:center;" bgcolor=#FFDDDD| 1–2
|-
| 1982–83
| UEFA Cup
| R1
|  1. FC Köln
| style="text-align:center;" bgcolor=#FFDDDD| 0–1
| style="text-align:center;" bgcolor=#FFDDDD| 0–5
| style="text-align:center;" bgcolor=#FFDDDD| 0–6
|align="center"|
|-
| 1983–84
| European Cup Winners' Cup
| R1
|  Újpest
| style="text-align:center;" bgcolor=#DDFFDD| 2–0
| style="text-align:center;" bgcolor=#FFDDDD| 1–4
| style="text-align:center;" bgcolor=#FFDDDD| 3–4
|align="center"|
|-
| 1985–86
| UEFA Cup
| R1
|  Real Madrid
| style="text-align:center;" bgcolor=#DDFFDD| 1–0
| style="text-align:center;" bgcolor=#FFDDDD| 0–5
| style="text-align:center;" bgcolor=#FFDDDD| 1–5
|align="center"|
|-
| 1986–87
| UEFA Cup
| R1
|  Internazionale
| style="text-align:center;" bgcolor=#FFDDDD| 0–1
| style="text-align:center;" bgcolor=#FFDDDD| 0–2
| style="text-align:center;" bgcolor=#FFDDDD| 0–3
|align="center"|
|-
| 1988–89
| UEFA Cup
| R1
|  Athletic Bilbao
| style="text-align:center;" bgcolor=#DDFFDD| 1–0
| style="text-align:center;" bgcolor=#FFDDDD| 0–2
| style="text-align:center;" bgcolor=#FFDDDD| 1–2
|align="center"|
|-
| rowspan="2"| 1989–90
| rowspan="2"| European Cup
| R1
|  Dynamo Dresden
| style="text-align:center;" bgcolor=#DDFFDD| 5–3
| style="text-align:center;" bgcolor=#FFDDDD| 0–1
| style="text-align:center;" bgcolor=#DDFFDD| 5–4
| align="center"|
|-
| R2
|  Marseille
| style="text-align:center;" bgcolor=#FFFFDD| 1–1
| style="text-align:center;" bgcolor=#FFDDDD| 0–2
| style="text-align:center;" bgcolor=#FFDDDD| 1–3
|align="center"|
|-
| rowspan="3"| 1991–92
| rowspan="3"| UEFA Cup
| R1
|  Vllaznia
| style="text-align:center;" bgcolor=#DDFFDD| 2–0
| style="text-align:center;" bgcolor=#DDFFDD| 1–0
| style="text-align:center;" bgcolor=#DDFFDD| 3–0
| align="center"|
|-
| R2
|  Spartak Moscow
| style="text-align:center;" bgcolor=#DDFFDD| 2–1
| style="text-align:center;" bgcolor=#FFFFDD| 0–0
| style="text-align:center;" bgcolor=#DDFFDD| 2–1
| align="center"|
|-
| R3
|  Torino
| style="text-align:center;" bgcolor=#FFFFDD| 2–2
| style="text-align:center;" bgcolor=#FFDDDD| 0–1
| style="text-align:center;" bgcolor=#FFDDDD| 2–3
|align="center"|
|-
| rowspan="2"| 1992–93
| rowspan="2"| UEFA Champions League
| R1
|  APOEL
| style="text-align:center;" bgcolor=#FFFFDD| 1–1
| style="text-align:center;" bgcolor=#FFFFDD| 2–2
| style="text-align:center;" bgcolor=#DDFFDD| 3–3 (a)
| align="center"|
|-
| R2
|  PSV Eindhoven
| style="text-align:center;" bgcolor=#DDFFDD| 1–0
| style="text-align:center;" bgcolor=#FFDDDD| 0–3
| style="text-align:center;" bgcolor=#FFDDDD| 1–3
|align="center"|
|-
| 1993–94
| UEFA Champions League
| R1
|  Monaco
| style="text-align:center;" bgcolor=#FFFFDD| 1–1
| style="text-align:center;" bgcolor=#FFDDDD| 0–1
| style="text-align:center;" bgcolor=#FFDDDD| 1–2
|align="center"|
|-
| rowspan="4"| 1994–95
| rowspan="4"| UEFA Champions League
| QR
|  Rangers
| style="text-align:center;" bgcolor=#DDFFDD| 2–0
| style="text-align:center;" bgcolor=#DDFFDD| 1–0
| style="text-align:center;" bgcolor=#DDFFDD| 3–0
| align="center"|
|-
| rowspan="3"| Grp
|  Casino Salzburg
| style="text-align:center;" bgcolor=#FFDDDD| 1–3
| style="text-align:center;" bgcolor=#FFFFDD| 0–0
| style="text-align:center;" bgcolor=#FFDDDD rowspan=3| 4th
| rowspan=3 align="center"|
|-
|  Ajax
| style="text-align:center;" bgcolor=#FFDDDD| 1–2
| style="text-align:center;" bgcolor=#FFDDDD| 0–2
|-
|  Milan
| style="text-align:center;" bgcolor=#FFFFDD| 0–0
| style="text-align:center;" bgcolor=#FFDDDD| 1–2
|-
| rowspan="2"| 1995–96
| rowspan="2"| UEFA Cup Winners' Cup
| R1
|  Sion
| style="text-align:center;" bgcolor=#DDFFDD| 2–0
| style="text-align:center;" bgcolor=#FFFFDD| 2–2
| style="text-align:center;" bgcolor=#DDFFDD| 4–2
| align="center"|
|-
| R2
|  Borussia Mönchengladbach
| style="text-align:center;" bgcolor=#FFDDDD| 0–1
| style="text-align:center;" bgcolor=#FFDDDD| 1–4
| style="text-align:center;" bgcolor=#FFDDDD| 1–5
|align="center"|
|-
| rowspan="3"| 1996–97
| rowspan="3"| UEFA Cup Winners' Cup
| R1
|  Humenné
| style="text-align:center;" bgcolor=#DDFFDD| 1–0
| style="text-align:center;" bgcolor=#DDFFDD| 2–1
| style="text-align:center;" bgcolor=#DDFFDD| 3–1
| align="center"|
|-
| R2
|  Olimpija Ljubljana
| style="text-align:center;" bgcolor=#DDFFDD| 4–0
| style="text-align:center;" bgcolor=#DDFFDD| 2–0
| style="text-align:center;" bgcolor=#DDFFDD| 6–0
| align="center"|
|-
| QF
|  Paris Saint-Germain
| style="text-align:center;" bgcolor=#FFDDDD| 0–3
| style="text-align:center;" bgcolor=#FFFFDD| 0–0
| style="text-align:center;" bgcolor=#FFDDDD| 0–3
|align="center"|
|-
| rowspan="3"| 1997–98
| rowspan="3"| UEFA Cup Winners' Cup
| R1
|  Dinaburg
| style="text-align:center;" bgcolor=#DDFFDD| 5–0
| style="text-align:center;" bgcolor=#DDFFDD| 4–2
| style="text-align:center;" bgcolor=#DDFFDD| 9–2
| align="center"|
|-
| R2
|  Sturm Graz
| style="text-align:center;" bgcolor=#DDFFDD| 2–0
| style="text-align:center;" bgcolor=#FFDDDD| 0–1
| style="text-align:center;" bgcolor=#DDFFDD| 2–1
| align="center"|
|-
| QF
|  Lokomotiv Moscow
| style="text-align:center;" bgcolor=#FFFFDD| 0–0
| style="text-align:center;" bgcolor=#FFDDDD| 1–2
| style="text-align:center;" bgcolor=#FFDDDD| 1–2
|align="center"|
|-
| rowspan="2"| 1998–99
| rowspan="2"| UEFA Cup
| 2QR
|  Ferencváros
| style="text-align:center;" bgcolor=#DDFFDD| 4–0
| style="text-align:center;" bgcolor=#FFDDDD| 2–4
| style="text-align:center;" bgcolor=#DDFFDD| 6–4
| align="center"|
|-
| R1
|  Vitesse
| style="text-align:center;" bgcolor=#FFFFDD| 3–3
| style="text-align:center;" bgcolor=#FFDDDD| 0–3
| style="text-align:center;" bgcolor=#FFDDDD| 3–6
|align="center"|
|-
| rowspan="4"| 1999–00
| UEFA Champions League
| 3QR
|  AIK
| style="text-align:center;" bgcolor=#FFFFDD| 0–0
| style="text-align:center;" bgcolor=#FFDDDD| 0–1
| style="text-align:center;" bgcolor=#FFDDDD| 0–1
|align="center"|
|-
| rowspan="3"| UEFA Cup
| R1
|  Torpedo Kutaisi
| style="text-align:center;" bgcolor=#DDFFDD| 6–1
| style="text-align:center;" bgcolor=#DDFFDD| 1–0
| style="text-align:center;" bgcolor=#DDFFDD| 7–1
| align="center"|
|-
| R2
|  MTK
| style="text-align:center;" bgcolor=#DDFFDD| 1–0
| style="text-align:center;" bgcolor=#FFDDDD| 1–2
| style="text-align:center;" bgcolor=#DDFFDD| 2–2 (a)
| align="center"|
|-
| R3
|  Monaco
| style="text-align:center;" bgcolor=#FFFFDD| 2–2
| style="text-align:center;" bgcolor=#FFDDDD| 0–1
| style="text-align:center;" bgcolor=#FFDDDD| 2–3
|align="center"|
|-
| rowspan="4"| 2000–01
| rowspan="4"| UEFA Cup
| R1
|  Vasas
| style="text-align:center;" bgcolor=#DDFFDD| 2–0
| style="text-align:center;" bgcolor=#FFFFDD| 2–2
| style="text-align:center;" bgcolor=#DDFFDD| 4–2
| align="center"|
|-
| R2
|  Herfølge
| style="text-align:center;" bgcolor=#DDFFDD| 5–0
| style="text-align:center;" bgcolor=#FFDDDD| 1–2
| style="text-align:center;" bgcolor=#DDFFDD| 6–2
| align="center"|
|-
| R3
|  Bayer Leverkusen
| style="text-align:center;" bgcolor=#DDFFDD| 2–0
| style="text-align:center;" bgcolor=#FFFFDD| 4–4
| style="text-align:center;" bgcolor=#DDFFDD| 6–4
| align="center"|
|-
| R4
|  Barcelona
| style="text-align:center;" bgcolor=#FFDDDD| 0–1
| style="text-align:center;" bgcolor=#FFDDDD| 0–5
| style="text-align:center;" bgcolor=#FFDDDD| 0–6
|align="center"|
|-
| rowspan="5"| 2001–02
| rowspan="5"| UEFA Cup
| QR
|  Grevenmacher
| style="text-align:center;" bgcolor=#DDFFDD| 6–0
| style="text-align:center;" bgcolor=#DDFFDD| 2–0
| style="text-align:center;" bgcolor=#DDFFDD| 8–0
| align="center"|
|-
| R1
|  Hibernian
| style="text-align:center;" bgcolor=#DDFFDD| 2–0
| style="text-align:center;" bgcolor=#FFDDDD| 2–3 
| style="text-align:center;" bgcolor=#DDFFDD| 4–3
| align="center"|
|-
| R2
|  Osijek
| style="text-align:center;" bgcolor=#DDFFDD| 2–1
| style="text-align:center;" bgcolor=#DDFFDD| 3–2
| style="text-align:center;" bgcolor=#DDFFDD| 5–3
| align="center"|
|-
| R3
|  Litex Lovech
| style="text-align:center;" bgcolor=#DDFFDD| 3–2
| style="text-align:center;" bgcolor=#FFFFDD| 1–1
| style="text-align:center;" bgcolor=#DDFFDD| 4–3
| align="center"|
|-
| R4
|  Internazionale
| style="text-align:center;" bgcolor=#FFFFDD| 2–2
| style="text-align:center;" bgcolor=#FFDDDD| 1–3
| style="text-align:center;" bgcolor=#FFDDDD| 3–5
|align="center"|
|-
| rowspan="6"| 2002–03
| rowspan="4"| UEFA Champions League
| 3QR
|  APOEL
| style="text-align:center;" bgcolor=#DDFFDD| 1–0
| style="text-align:center;" bgcolor=#DDFFDD| 3–2
| style="text-align:center;" bgcolor=#DDFFDD| 4–2
| align="center"|
|-
| rowspan="3"| Grp
|  Racing Genk
| style="text-align:center;" bgcolor=#FFFFDD| 1–1
| style="text-align:center;" bgcolor=#FFFFDD| 0–0
| style="text-align:center;" bgcolor=#FFFFDD rowspan=3| 3rd
| rowspan=3 align="center"|
|-
|  Roma
| style="text-align:center;" bgcolor=#FFFFDD| 0–0
| style="text-align:center;" bgcolor=#FFFFDD| 1–1
|-
|  Real Madrid
| style="text-align:center;" bgcolor=#FFFFDD| 3–3
| style="text-align:center;" bgcolor=#FFFFDD| 2–2
|-
| rowspan="2"| UEFA Cup
| R3
|  Maccabi Haifa
| style="text-align:center;" bgcolor=#DDFFDD| 4–0
| style="text-align:center;" bgcolor=#DDFFDD| 4–1
| style="text-align:center;" bgcolor=#DDFFDD| 8–1
| align="center"|
|-
| R4
|  Málaga
| style="text-align:center;" bgcolor=#FFDDDD| 0–1
| style="text-align:center;" bgcolor=#FFFFDD| 0–0
| style="text-align:center;" bgcolor=#FFDDDD| 0–1
|align="center"|
|-
| rowspan="4"| 2003–04
| rowspan="4"| UEFA Champions League
| 3QR
|  Grasshopper
| style="text-align:center;" bgcolor=#DDFFDD| 3–1
| style="text-align:center;" bgcolor=#FFDDDD| 0–1
| style="text-align:center;" bgcolor=#DDFFDD| 3–2
| align="center"|
|-
| rowspan="3"| Grp
|  Deportivo La Coruña
| style="text-align:center;" bgcolor=#FFFFDD| 1–1
| style="text-align:center;" bgcolor=#FFDDDD| 0–3
| style="text-align:center;" bgcolor=#FFDDDD rowspan=3| 4th
| rowspan=3 align="center"|
|-
|  Monaco
| style="text-align:center;" bgcolor=#FFFFDD| 0–0
| style="text-align:center;" bgcolor=#FFDDDD| 0–4
|-
|  PSV Eindhoven
| style="text-align:center;" bgcolor=#FFDDDD| 0–1
| style="text-align:center;" bgcolor=#FFDDDD| 0–2
|-
| rowspan="5"| 2004–05
| rowspan="5"| UEFA Cup
| R1
|  Gorica
| style="text-align:center;" bgcolor=#DDFFDD| 1–0
| style="text-align:center;" bgcolor=#FFFFDD| 1–1
| style="text-align:center;" bgcolor=#DDFFDD| 2–1
| align="center"|
|-
| rowspan="4"| Grp
|  Zenit Saint Petersburg
| style="text-align:center;" 
| style="text-align:center;" bgcolor=#FFDDDD| 1–5
| style="text-align:center;" bgcolor=#FFDDDD rowspan=4| 5th
| rowspan=4 align="center"|
|-
|  Lille
| style="text-align:center;" bgcolor=#FFDDDD| 1–2
| style="text-align:center;" 
|-
|  Sevilla
| style="text-align:center;" 
| style="text-align:center;" bgcolor=#FFDDDD| 2–3
|-
|  Alemannia Aachen
| style="text-align:center;" bgcolor=#FFDDDD| 0–2
| style="text-align:center;" 
|-
| 2005–06
| UEFA Cup
| R1
|  Zenit Saint Petersburg
| style="text-align:center;" bgcolor=#FFDDDD| 0–1
| style="text-align:center;" bgcolor=#FFFFDD| 0–0
| style="text-align:center;" bgcolor=#FFDDDD| 0–1
|align="center"|
|-
| rowspan="5"| 2006–07
| rowspan="4"| UEFA Champions League
| 3QR
|  Heart of Midlothian
| style="text-align:center;" bgcolor=#DDFFDD| 3–0
| style="text-align:center;" bgcolor=#DDFFDD| 2–1
| style="text-align:center;" bgcolor=#DDFFDD| 5–1
| align="center"|
|-
| rowspan="3"| Grp
|  Milan
| style="text-align:center;" bgcolor=#DDFFDD| 1–0
| style="text-align:center;" bgcolor=#FFDDDD| 0–3
| style="text-align:center;" bgcolor=#FFFFDD rowspan=3| 3rd
| rowspan=3 align="center"|
|-
|  Anderlecht
| style="text-align:center;" bgcolor=#FFFFDD| 1–1
| style="text-align:center;" bgcolor=#FFFFDD| 2–2
|-
|  Lille
| style="text-align:center;" bgcolor=#DDFFDD| 1–0
| style="text-align:center;" bgcolor=#FFDDDD| 1–3
|-
| UEFA Cup
| R32
|  Paris Saint-Germain
| style="text-align:center;" bgcolor=#FFDDDD| 0–2
| style="text-align:center;" bgcolor=#FFDDDD| 0–2
| style="text-align:center;" bgcolor=#FFDDDD| 0–4
|align="center"|
|-
| rowspan="7"| 2007–08
| UEFA Champions League
| 3QR
|  Sevilla
| style="text-align:center;" bgcolor=#FFDDDD| 1–4
| style="text-align:center;" bgcolor=#FFDDDD| 0–2
| style="text-align:center;" bgcolor=#FFDDDD| 1–6
|align="center"|
|-
| rowspan="6"| UEFA Cup
| R1
|  Red Bull Salzburg
| style="text-align:center;" bgcolor=#DDFFDD| 3–0
| style="text-align:center;" bgcolor=#FFDDDD| 0–1
| style="text-align:center;" bgcolor=#DDFFDD| 3–1
| align="center"|
|-
| rowspan="4"| Grp
|  Elfsborg
| style="text-align:center;" 
| style="text-align:center;" bgcolor=#FFFFDD| 1–1
| style="text-align:center;" bgcolor=#DDFFDD rowspan=4| 3rd
| rowspan=4 align="center"|
|-
|  Fiorentina
| style="text-align:center;" bgcolor=#FFFFDD| 1–1
| style="text-align:center;" 
|-
|  Mladá Boleslav
| style="text-align:center;" 
| style="text-align:center;" bgcolor=#DDFFDD| 1–0
|-
|  Villarreal
| style="text-align:center;" bgcolor=#FFDDDD| 1–2
| style="text-align:center;" 
|-
| R32
|  Getafe
| style="text-align:center;" bgcolor=#FFFFDD| 1–1
| style="text-align:center;" bgcolor=#FFDDDD| 0–3
| style="text-align:center;" bgcolor=#FFDDDD| 1–4
| align="center"|
|-
| 2008–09
| UEFA Cup
| 2QR
|  Omonia
| style="text-align:center;" bgcolor=#FFDDDD| 0–1
| style="text-align:center;" bgcolor=#FFFFDD| 2–2
| style="text-align:center;" bgcolor=#FFDDDD| 2–3
|align="center"|
|-
| rowspan="4"| 2009–10
| rowspan="4"| UEFA Europa League
| PO
|  Vaslui
| style="text-align:center;" bgcolor=#DDFFDD| 3–0
| style="text-align:center;" bgcolor=#FFDDDD| 1–2
| style="text-align:center;" bgcolor=#DDFFDD| 4–2
| align="center"|
|-
| rowspan="3"| Grp
|  Everton
| style="text-align:center;" bgcolor=#FFDDDD| 0–1
| style="text-align:center;" bgcolor=#FFDDDD| 0–4
| style="text-align:center;" bgcolor=#FFDDDD rowspan=3| 4th
| rowspan=3 align="center"|
|-
|  Benfica
| style="text-align:center;" bgcolor=#DDFFDD| 1–0
| style="text-align:center;" bgcolor=#FFDDDD| 1–2
|-
|  BATE Borisov
| style="text-align:center;" bgcolor=#FFFFDD| 2–2
| style="text-align:center;" bgcolor=#FFDDDD| 1–2
|-
| rowspan="4"| 2010–11
| rowspan="4"| UEFA Europa League
| PO
|  Dundee United
| style="text-align:center;" bgcolor=#FFFFDD| 1–1
| style="text-align:center;" bgcolor=#DDFFDD| 1–0
| style="text-align:center;" bgcolor=#DDFFDD| 2–1
| align="center"|
|-
| rowspan="3"| Grp
|  Zenit Saint Petersburg
| style="text-align:center;" bgcolor=#FFDDDD| 0–3
| style="text-align:center;" bgcolor=#FFDDDD| 2–4
| style="text-align:center;" bgcolor=#FFDDDD rowspan=3| 3rd
| rowspan=3 align="center"|
|-
|  Anderlecht
| style="text-align:center;" bgcolor=#FFFFDD| 1–1
| style="text-align:center;" bgcolor=#FFDDDD| 0–3
|-
|  Hajduk Split
| style="text-align:center;" bgcolor=#DDFFDD| 3–1
| style="text-align:center;" bgcolor=#DDFFDD| 3–1
|-
| rowspan="4"| 2011–12
| rowspan="4"| UEFA Europa League
| PO
|  Dinamo Tbilisi
| style="text-align:center;" bgcolor=#DDFFDD| 1–0
| style="text-align:center;" bgcolor=#FFFFDD| 1–1 
| style="text-align:center;" bgcolor=#DDFFDD| 2–1
| align="center"|
|-
| rowspan="3"| Grp
|  Anderlecht
| style="text-align:center;" bgcolor=#FFDDDD| 1–2
| style="text-align:center;" bgcolor=#FFDDDD| 1–4
| style="text-align:center;" bgcolor=#FFDDDD rowspan=3| 3rd
| rowspan=3 align="center"|
|-
|  Sturm Graz
| style="text-align:center;" bgcolor=#FFDDDD| 1–2
| style="text-align:center;" bgcolor=#DDFFDD| 3–1
|-
|  Lokomotiv Moscow
| style="text-align:center;" bgcolor=#FFDDDD| 1–3
| style="text-align:center;" bgcolor=#FFDDDD| 1–3
|-
| 2016–17
| UEFA Europa League
| 3QR
|  Saint-Étienne
| style="text-align:center;" bgcolor=#FFDDDD| 0–1
| style="text-align:center;" bgcolor=#FFFFDD| 0–0
| style="text-align:center;" bgcolor=#FFDDDD| 0–1
|align="center"|
|-
| rowspan="6"| 2017–18
| UEFA Champions League
| 3QR
|  CSKA Moscow
| style="text-align:center;" bgcolor=#FFDDDD| 0–2
| style="text-align:center;" bgcolor=#FFDDDD| 0–1
| style="text-align:center;" bgcolor=#FFDDDD| 0–3
|align="center"|
|-
| rowspan="5"| UEFA Europa League
| PO
|  Club Brugge
| style="text-align:center;" bgcolor=#DDFFDD| 3–0
| style="text-align:center;" bgcolor=#FFFFDD| 0–0
| style="text-align:center;" bgcolor=#DDFFDD| 3–0
| align="center"|
|-
| rowspan="3"| Grp
|  Milan
| style="text-align:center;" bgcolor=#FFFFDD| 0–0
| style="text-align:center;" bgcolor=#FFFFDD| 0–0
| style="text-align:center;" bgcolor=#DDFFDD rowspan=3| 2nd
| rowspan=3 align="center"|
|-
|  Austria Wien
| style="text-align:center;" bgcolor=#FFFFDD| 2–2
| style="text-align:center;" bgcolor=#FFFFDD| 0–0
|-
|  Rijeka
| style="text-align:center;" bgcolor=#FFFFDD| 2–2
| style="text-align:center;" bgcolor=#DDFFDD| 2–1
|-
| R32
|  Dynamo Kyiv
| style="text-align:center;" bgcolor=#FFFFDD| 1–1
| style="text-align:center;" bgcolor=#FFFFDD| 0–0
| style="text-align:center;" bgcolor=#FFDDDD| 1–1 (a)
|align="center"|
|-
| rowspan="5"| 2018–19
| rowspan="5"| UEFA Champions League
| 3QR
|  Celtic
| style="text-align:center;" bgcolor=#DDFFDD| 2–1
| style="text-align:center;" bgcolor=#FFFFDD| 1–1
| style="text-align:center;" bgcolor=#DDFFDD| 3–2 
| align="center"|
|-
| rowspan="1"| PO
|  MOL Vidi
| style="text-align:center;" bgcolor=#FFFFDD| 1–1
| style="text-align:center;" bgcolor=#DDFFDD| 2–1
| style="text-align:center;" bgcolor=#DDFFDD| 3–2 
| align="center"|
|-
| rowspan="3"| Grp
|  Bayern Munich
| style="text-align:center;" bgcolor=#FFDDDD| 0–2
| style="text-align:center;" bgcolor=#FFDDDD| 0–2 
| style="text-align:center;" bgcolor=#FFDDDD rowspan=3| 4th
| rowspan=3 align="center"|
|-
|  Benfica
| style="text-align:center;" bgcolor=#FFDDDD| 2–3
| style="text-align:center;" bgcolor=#FFDDDD| 0–1
|-
|  Ajax
| style="text-align:center;" bgcolor=#FFDDDD| 0–2
| style="text-align:center;" bgcolor=#FFDDDD| 0–3
|-
| rowspan="2"| 2019–20
| rowspan="2"|UEFA Europa League
| 3QR
|  Universitatea Craiova
| style="text-align:center;" bgcolor=#FFFFDD| 1–1 
| style="text-align:center;" bgcolor=#DDFFDD| 2–0 
| style="text-align:center;" bgcolor=#DDFFDD| 3–1 
| align="center"|
|-
| rowspan="1"| PO
|  Trabzonspor
| style="text-align:center;" bgcolor=#FFDDDD| 1–3 
| style="text-align:center;" bgcolor=#DDFFDD| 2–0 
| style="text-align:center;" bgcolor=#FFDDDD| 3–3 (a)
|align="center"|
|- 
| rowspan="5"| 2020–21
| rowspan="5"|UEFA Europa League
| 3QR
|  St. Gallen
| 
| style="text-align:center;" bgcolor=#DDFFDD| 1–0 
| 
|align="center"|
|-
| PO
|  Wolfsburg
| style="text-align:center;" bgcolor=#DDFFDD| 2–1 
| 
| 
|align="center"|
|-
| rowspan="3"| Grp
|  Leicester City
| style="text-align:center;" bgcolor=#FFDDDD| 1–2 
| style="text-align:center;" bgcolor=#FFDDDD| 0–2 
| style="text-align:center;" bgcolor=#FFDDDD rowspan=3| 4th
| rowspan=3 align="center"|
|-
|  Braga
| style="text-align:center;" bgcolor=#FFDDDD| 2–4 
| style="text-align:center;" bgcolor=#FFDDDD| 0–3 
|-
|  Zorya Luhansk
| style="text-align:center;" bgcolor=#FFDDDD| 0–3
| style="text-align:center;" bgcolor=#DDFFDD| 4–1
|-
| 2021–22
| UEFA Europa Conference League
| 2QR
|  Velež Mostar
| style="text-align:center;" bgcolor=#DDFFDD| 1–0
| style="text-align:center;" bgcolor=#FFDDDD| 1–2 
| style="text-align:center;" bgcolor=#FFDDDD| 2–2 (2–3p)
| align="center"|
|-

Record by country of opposition

{|class="wikitable sortable" style="text-align:center" 
! rowspan=2| Country
! colspan=7| Home
! colspan=7| Away
! colspan=8| Total
|-
! Pld
! W
! D
! L
! GF
! GA
! GD
! Pld
! W
! D
! L
! GF
! GA
! GD
! Pld
! W
! D
! L
! GF
! GA
! GD
! Win%
|-
|-bgcolor="#CCFFCC"
| align=left| 
| 3
| 2
| 0
| 1
| 5
| 5
| 0
| 3
| 1
| 0
| 2
| 2
| 5
| -3
| 6
| 3
| 0
| 3
| 7
| 10
| -3
| 
|-
|-bgcolor="#FFBBBB"
| align=left| 
| 5
| 2
| 1
| 2
| 9
| 7
| +2
| 5
| 1
| 2
| 2
| 3
| 3
| 0
| 10 
| 3
| 3
| 4
| 12
| 10
| +2
| 
|-
|-bgcolor="#FFBBBB"
| align=left| 
| 6
| 1
| 4
| 1
| 9
| 7
| +2
| 6
| 0
| 3
| 3
| 4
| 13
| -9
| 12
| 1
| 7
| 4
| 13
| 20
| -7
| 
|-
|-bgcolor="#FFBBBB"
| align=left| 
| 1
| 0
| 1
| 0
| 2
| 2
| 0
| 1
| 0
| 0
| 1
| 1
| 2
| -1
| 2
| 0
| 1
| 1
| 3
| 4
| -1
| 
|-
|-bgcolor="#CCFFCC"
| align=left| 
| 2
| 2
| 0
| 0
| 4
| 1
| +3
| 2
| 0
| 0
| 2
| 1
| 4
| -3
| 4
| 2
| 0
| 2
| 5
| 5
| 0
| 
|-
|-bgcolor="#FFBBBB"
| align=left| 
| 4
| 3
| 0
| 1
| 7
| 6
| +1
| 4
| 0
| 2
| 2
| 5
| 9
| -4
| 8
| 3
| 2
| 3
| 12
| 15
| -3
| 
|-
|-bgcolor="#CCFFCC"
| align=left| 
| 4
| 3
| 1
| 0
| 9
| 4
| +5
| 4
| 3
| 0
| 1
| 8
| 7
| +1
| 8
| 6
| 1
| 1
| 17
| 11
| +6
| 
|-
|-bgcolor="#FFBBBB"
| align=left| 
| 3
| 1
| 1
| 1
| 2
| 2
| 0
| 3
| 1
| 2
| 0
| 7
| 6
| +1
| 6
| 2
| 3
| 1
| 9
| 8
| +1
| 
|-
|-bgcolor="#CCFFCC"
| align=left| 
| 0
| 0
| 0
| 0
| 0
| 0
| 0
| 1
| 1
| 0
| 0
| 1
| 0
| +1
| 1
| 1
| 0
| 0
| 1
| 0
| +1
| 
|-
|-bgcolor="#CCFFCC"
| align=left| 
| 2
| 1
| 1
| 0
| 5
| 0
| +5
| 2
| 1
| 0
| 1
| 3
| 2
| +1
| 4
| 2
| 1
| 1
| 8
| 2
| +6
| 
|-
|-bgcolor="#FFBBBB"
| align=left| 
| 6
| 2
| 0
| 4
| 8
| 8
| 0
| 6
| 1
| 0
| 5
| 4
| 19
| -15
| 12
| 3
| 0
| 9
| 12
| 27
| -15
| 
|-
|-bgcolor="#FFBBBB"
| align=left| 
| 10
| 1
| 5
| 4
| 7
| 13
| -6
| 9
| 0
| 2
| 7
| 3
| 20
| -17
| 19
| 1
| 7
| 11
| 10
| 33
| -23
| 
|-
|-bgcolor="#CCFFCC"
| align=left| 
| 2
| 2
| 0
| 0
| 7
| 1
| +6
| 2
| 1
| 1
| 0
| 2
| 1
| +1
| 4
| 3
| 1
| 0
| 9
| 2
| +8
| 
|-
|-bgcolor="#FFBBBB"
| align=left| 
| 7
| 3
| 0
| 4
| 9
| 10
| -1
| 5
| 0
| 1
| 4
| 5
| 16
| -11
| 12
| 3
| 1
| 8
| 14
| 26
| -12
| 
|-
|-bgcolor="#CCFFCC"
| align=left| 
| 6
| 5
| 1
| 0
| 13
| 2
| +11
| 6
| 1
| 2
| 3
| 9
| 14
| -5
| 12
| 6
| 3
| 3
| 22
| 16
| +6
| 
|-
|-bgcolor="#CCFFCC"
| align=left| 
| 1
| 1
| 0
| 0
| 4
| 0
| +4
| 1
| 1
| 0
| 0
| 4
| 1
| +3
| 2
| 2
| 0
| 0
| 8
| 1
| +7
| 
|-
|-bgcolor="#FFBBBB"
| align=left| 
| 10
| 2
| 6
| 2
| 9
| 9
| 0
| 9
| 0
| 2
| 7
| 5
| 20
| -15
| 19
| 2
| 8
| 9
| 14
| 29
| -15
| 
|-
|-bgcolor="#CCFFCC"
| align=left| 
| 1
| 1
| 0
| 0
| 5
| 0
| +5
| 1
| 1
| 0
| 0
| 4
| 2
| +2
| 2
| 2
| 0
| 0
| 9
| 2
| +7
| 
|-
|-bgcolor="#CCFFCC"
| align=left| 
| 2
| 2
| 0
| 0
| 9
| 0
| +9
| 2
| 1
| 0
| 1
| 4
| 3
| +1
| 4
| 3
| 0
| 1
| 13
| 3
| +10
| 
|-
|-bgcolor="#CCFFCC"
| align=left| 
| 1
| 1
| 0
| 0
| 1
| 0
| +1
| 1
| 0
| 1
| 0
| 1
| 1
| 0
| 2
| 1
| 1
| 0
| 2
| 1
| +1
| 
|-
|-bgcolor="#FFBBBB"
| align=left| 
| 6
| 1
| 1
| 4
| 5
| 9
| -4
| 6
| 0
| 0
| 6
| 0
| 16
| -16
| 12
| 1
| 1
| 10
| 5
| 25
| -20
| 
|-
|-bgcolor="#FFBBBB"
| align=left| 
| 5
| 2
| 0
| 3
| 11
| 9
| +2
| 5
| 0
| 0
| 5
| 4
| 13
| -9
| 10
| 2
| 0
| 8
| 15
| 22
| -7
| 
|-
|-bgcolor="#FFBBBB"
| align=left| 
| 5
| 4
| 1
| 1
| 14
| 5
| +9
| 6
| 1
| 1
| 4
| 4
| 10
| -6
| 12
| 5
| 2
| 5
| 18
| 15
| +3
| 
|-
|-bgcolor="#FFBBBB"
| align=left| 
| 7
| 2
| 1
| 4
| 5
| 10
| -5
| 8
| 0
| 2
| 6
| 6
| 17
| -11
| 15
| 2
| 3
| 10
| 11
| 27
| -16
| 
|-
|-bgcolor="#CCFFCC"
| align=left| 
| 5
| 4
| 1
| 0
| 10
| 2
| +8
| 5
| 3
| 1
| 1
| 7
| 5
| +2
| 10
| 7
| 2
| 1
| 17
| 7
| +10
| 
|-
|-bgcolor="#CCFFCC"
| align=left| 
| 2
| 2
| 0
| 0
| 5
| 1
| +4
| 2
| 0
| 1
| 1
| 1
| 3
| -2
| 4
| 2
| 1
| 1
| 6
| 4
| +2
| 
|-
|-bgcolor="#CCFFCC"
| align=left| 
| 3
| 2
| 1
| 0
| 5
| 2
| +3
| 3
| 1
| 0
| 2
| 3
| 5
| -2
| 6
| 3
| 1
| 2
| 8
| 7
| +1
| 
|-
|-bgcolor="#CCFFCC"
| align=left| 
| 3
| 2
| 1
| 0
| 5
| 0
| +5
| 3
| 1
| 2
| 0
| 6
| 4
| +2
| 6
| 3
| 3
| 0
| 11
| 4
| +7
| 
|-
|-bgcolor="#FFBBBB"
| align=left| 
| 9
| 2
| 3
| 4
| 9
| 13
| -4
| 9
| 0
| 2
| 7
| 4
| 25
| -21
| 18
| 2
| 5
| 11
| 13
| 38
| -25
| 
|-
|-bgcolor="#FFBBBB"
| align=left| 
| 1
| 0
| 1
| 0
| 0
| 0
| 0
| 2
| 0
| 1
| 1
| 1
| 2
| -1
| 3
| 0
| 2
| 1
| 1
| 2
| -1
| 
|-
|-bgcolor="#CCFFCC"
| align=left| 
| 2
| 2
| 0
| 0
| 5
| 1
| +4
| 3
| 1
| 1
| 1
| 3
| 3
| 0
| 5
| 3
| 1
| 1
| 8
| 4
| +4
| 
|-
|-bgcolor="#FFBBBB"
| align=left| 
| 4
| 2
| 1
| 1
| 8
| 7
| +1
| 5
| 1
| 0
| 4
| 4
| 12
| -8
| 9
| 3
| 1
| 5
| 12
| 19
| -7
| 
|-
|-bgcolor="#FFBBBB"
| align=left| 
| 2
| 0
| 1
| 1
| 1
| 4
| -3
| 2
| 1
| 1
| 0
| 4
| 1
| +3
| 4
| 1
| 2
| 1
| 5
| 5
| 0
| 
|-class="sortbottom"
! align=left| 
!131
!60
!33
!38
!207
!140
!+67
!132
!23
!30
!79
!123
!264
!-141
!263
!83
!63
!117
!330
!404
!-74
!

 1970–71 Inter-Cities Fairs Cup matches against Twente are included.
 1960–61, 1966–67, 1967–68 and 1980–81 Balkans Cup matches are included.
 Last entry is the second match against Velež Mostar for the 2021–22 Europa Conference League second qualifying round.
 The record after the last entry is 263 matches in total (83W, 63D, 117L, GF330, GA404), with 131 home matches (60W, 33D, 38L, GF207, GA140) and 132 away matches (23W, 30D, 79L, GF123, GA264).

Players

Goalscorers

{| class="wikitable" style="text-align:center"
|-
! rowspan="2" |Rank.
! rowspan="2" |Nat.
! rowspan="2" |Name
! rowspan="2" |Career
! colspan="5" |Goals
|-
!Total
!EC1
!EC2
!EC3
!EC4
|-
| 1
| 
| align=left| Demis Nikolaidis
| 
| 26
| 2
| 3
| 21
| 0
|-
| 2
| 
| align=left| Mimis Papaioannou
| 1962–1980
| 11
| 4
| 2
| 5
| 0
|-
| 3
| 
| align=left| Vassilios Tsiartas
| 1992–19962000–2004
| 10
| 2
| 0
| 8
| 0
|-
| rowspan=4| 4
| 
| align=left| Vassilis Lakis
| 1998–20042005–2007
| rowspan=4| 8
| 2
| 0
| 6
| 0
|-
| 
| align=left| Daniel Batista
| 1989–19921995–1999
| 0
| 5
| 3
| 0
|-
| 
| align=left| Ismael Blanco
| 2007–2011
| 0
| 0
| 8
| 0
|-
| 
| align=left| Marko Livaja
| 2017–2021
| 1
| 0
| 7
| 0
|-
| 5
| 
| align=left| Petros Mantalos
| 2014–
| rowspan=1| 7
| 1
| 0
| 5
| 1
|-
| rowspan=4| 6
| 
| align=left| Toni Savevski
| 1988–2001
| rowspan=4| 6
| 5
| 1
| 0
| 0
|-
| 
| align=left| Nikos Liberopoulos
| 2003–20082010–2012
| 3
| 0
| 3
| 0
|-
| 
| align=left| Tasos Konstantinou
| 1972–1980
| 2
| 0
| 4
| 0
|-
| 
| align=left| Charis Kopitsis
| 1992–2001
| 0
| 3
| 3
| 0

Most Assists

Most Appearances

{| class="wikitable" style="text-align:center"
|-
! rowspan="2" |Nat.
! rowspan="2" |Name
! colspan="4" |Apps
|-
! Total
! EC1
! EC2
! EC3
|-
| 
| align=left| Michalis Kasapis
| 66
| 23
| 15
| 28
|-
| 
| align=left| Elias Atmatsidis
| rowspan=2| 51
| 12
| 16
| 23
|-
| 
| align=left| Demis Nikolaidis
| 10
| 11
| 30
|-
| 
| align=left| Vassilis Lakis
| 50
| 19
| 0
| 31
|-
| 
| align=left| Nikos Kostenoglou
| 49
| 13
| 13
| 23
|-
| 
| align=left| Vassilios Tsiartas
| rowspan=2| 47
| 25
| 3
| 19
|-
| 
| align=left| Toni Savevski
| 18
| 15
| 14
|-
| 
| align=left| Christos Maladenis
| 45
| 11
| 12
| 22
|-
| 
| align=left| Nikos Liberopoulos
| 40
| 16
| 0
| 24
|-
| 
| align=left| Stelios Manolas
| 38
| 14
| 13
| 11

Longest campaigns

{|
|valign="top" width=33%|

UEFA ranking

Notable matches

Notes

 a.  Inter Milan were the eventual runners-up.
 b.  A.C. Milan were the eventual winners.
 c.  Real Madrid C.F. were the defending winners and the eventual winners again.

Notable records

AEK Athens is the only club to have drawn all their games in the group stage of the Champions League (2002–03). It is the only club that has ever achieved six draws in six matches in a European competition.
AEK Athens is the only Greek club to have participated in the quarter-final round of all three European competitions at least once.
AEK Athens is the only Greek club to have reached the semi-final of the UEFA Cup (1976–77).
AEK Athens is the only Greek club to have participated in the Champions League without losing a single game (2002–03).
AEK Athens is the only Greek club to have participated in the Europa League without losing a single game (2017–18).
AEK Athens is the only Greek club to have advanced to the quarter-final of European competitions 2 consecutive seasons (1996–97, 1997–98).
AEK Athens is the only Greek club to have advanced to the last 16 of European competitions 4 consecutive seasons (1994–95, 1995–96, 1996–97, 1997–98).
AEK Athens is the only Greek club to have advanced to the last 16 of the Cup Winners' Cup 3 consecutive seasons (1995–96, 1996–97, 1997–98).
AEK Athens is the only Greek club to have advanced to the last 16 of the UEFA Cup 3 consecutive seasons (2000–01, 2001–02, 2002–03).
AEK Athens is the only Greek club that has participated in the group stage of both the Champions League and the Europa League without losing a single game (2002–03 and 2017–18).
AEK Athens is the only Greek club that has remained unbeaten for 14 consecutive European matches.
AEK Athens is the first Greek club that reached the quarter-final round of the Champions Cup (1968–69).
AEK Athens is the first Greek club that participated in the Champions League (1992–93).
AEK Athens is the first Greek club that participated in the group stage of the Champions League (1994–95).

European competition runs
Consecutive European games won: 4 (1996–97)
Consecutive European games drawn: 6 (2002–03)
Consecutive European games lost: 6 (2018–19)
Consecutive European games without a win: 7 (2003–04)
Consecutive European games without a draw: 20 (1977–89)
Consecutive European games without a loss: 14 (2017–18) (domestic record)
Consecutive European home games won: 6 (1975–77)
Consecutive European home games drawn: 4 (2017–18)
Consecutive European home games lost: 5 (2011–18)
Consecutive European home games without a win: 6 (2018–19)
Consecutive European home games without a draw: 12 (1970–77)
Consecutive European home games without a loss: 12 (1997–2000)
Consecutive European away games won: 2 (1996–97 and 2019–20)
Consecutive European away games drawn: 3 (2002–03 and 2017–18)
Consecutive European away games lost: 15 (1976–89)
Consecutive European away games without a win: 15 (1976–89)
Consecutive European away games without a draw: 19 (1975–91)
Consecutive European away games without a loss: 7 (2017–18)
Consecutive European games in which AEK scored: 12
Consecutive European games in which AEK conceded: 8
Consecutive European games without scoring: 5
Consecutive European games without conceding: 3

Match details

European Cup

UEFA Champions League

UEFA Cup

UEFA Europa League

References

European Cups
Greek football clubs in international competitions